Hey, Stop Stabbing Me! is a 2003 American comedy horror film starring Patrick Casey and directed by Worm Miller; Miller and Casey also co-wrote the script.  The duo went on to write Golan the Insatiable for Fox's Animation Domination HD programming block.

The film was shot on location in Bloomington, Minnesota.

Plot
Hey, Stop Stabbing Me! is the story of Herman Schumacher (Patrick Casey) and his new post-collegiate life.  After school ends Herman finds life a lot harder than he thought.  He needs to find a place to live, a job, and new friends.  The first two are solved surprisingly easy when he unknowingly moves into a house with a serial killer to fill one of the many vacancies and then gets a job as a "World Historian" which mainly consists of digging holes in an empty field.  Throw in crazy roommates and a sock stealing monster for good measure and wackiness ensues.

References

External links
 Amazing Schlock Film Factory Official Website
 
 

2003 films
2003 horror films
American comedy horror films
Films set in Minnesota
Films shot in Minnesota
2003 comedy horror films
Films with screenplays by Patrick Casey (writer)
Films with screenplays by Josh Miller (filmmaker)
Films directed by Josh Miller (filmmaker)
2003 comedy films
2000s English-language films
2000s American films